Vegfinans AS is a Norwegian toll company owned by the counties Innlandet, Vestfold og Telemark and Viken. The company was created on 14 February 2001 and is headquartered in Drammen. All toll roads in Norway have a toll road operator responsible for the financing of the road project. The right to demand payment of toll charges is granted when a toll charge agreement is entered into with the Norwegian Public Roads Administration.

Vegfinans AS is one of the regional toll companies created following the Government’s decision to merge the toll companies into five regional companies. The Government signed a new toll charge agreement with the company on 17 November 2017. The reform was proposed by Prime minister Solberg's cabinet and has four parts – a reduction of toll road operators, separation of the toll service provision for tolls and ferry tickets from the toll road companies, an interest compensation scheme for toll road loans, and a simplification of the price and discount schemes.

Projects 
Vegfinans AS consists of 20 wholly owned subsidiaries located in the region. Furthermore, Vegfinans provides administrative duties for an additional four companies that exist both within and outside the parent company.

All of Vegfinans' toll stations uses the Norwegian electronic toll collection system AutoPASS. A valid AutoPASS or EasyGo transponder (such as BroBizz) are valid in Norwegian toll stations through the EasyGo partnership.

Projects in the region 
 Bypakke Grenland
 E16 Oppland
 E6 Oppland
 Fv34 Oppland
 Østfold Bompengeselskap
 Bypakke Nedre Glomma
 E18 Vestfold
 E6 Ringebu - Otta
 Gausdalsvegene
 Oslofjordtunnelen
 E16 Kongsvingervegene
 E6 Gardermoen - Moelv
 Fv33 Oppland
 Hallingporten
 Tønsberg Hovedvegfinans
 E134 Buskerud
 Rv4 Oppland

See also 
 Bompengeselskap Nord
 Ferde
 Fjellinjen
 Vegamot

References 

Toll road operators in Norway
Toll roads in Norway
Norwegian companies established in 2001
Financial services companies of Norway
Companies owned by municipalities of Norway